Trémouille is a commune in the Cantal department in south-central France.

Geography
The river Rhue forms most of the commune's southwestern border.

Population

See also
Communes of the Cantal department
Trémouille-Saint-Loup

References

Communes of Cantal